Xtended Play Version 3.13 is the third studio album by Detroit-based hip hop duo Frank n Dank, released on October 24, 2006. The album features production from the likes of J Dilla, Oh No and Rich Kidd, and includes guest appearances from Brick & Lace, Kardinal Offishall, Saukrates, Jeru the Damaja and more.

Track listing

Bonus DVD

 The Frank N Dank Story
 McNasty Filth (Music video)
 M.C.A. (Music video)
 What Up (Music video)
 FND (Live)

Singles

Personnel
Credits for Xtended Play Version 3.13 adapted from AllMusic.

Frank n Dank — Primary Artist
Brick & Lace — Featured Artist
Buddah Brothas — Producer
P. Cauz — Producer
Jeru the Damaja — Featured Artist
J Dilla — Producer
DJ Dopey — Featured Artist
The 2 Swift Household — Producer
DJ Kemo — Producer, Featured Artist
Rich Kidd — Producer
Scott "Watson" Lake — Mastering
Lancecape — Producer
Tone Mason — Producer
Oh No — Producer
Kardinal Offishall — Featured Artist, Producer
Lindo P — Featured Artist
Reign — Featured Artist
Saukrates — Featured Artist, Producer
Brett Zilahi — Mastering

References

2006 albums
Frank n Dank albums
Albums produced by J Dilla
Albums produced by Tone Mason
Albums produced by Kardinal Offishall
Albums produced by Oh No (musician)
Albums produced by Saukrates